The H. Morse House is a historic house at 230 South Street in Southbridge, Massachusetts.  The -story wood-frame house was probably built in the 1840s, and is a well-preserved example of a rural Greek Revival farmhouse.  It was shown on an 1855 map as being owned by H. Morse, in the 1870s by Lyman Morse, and in 1878 by "Misses Morse".  The house has some excellent Greek Revival features, including pilastered corner borders and an ornately decorated front door surround.  A two-story addition was made to the side of the house in the 1870s, and another was made to the rear in the 20th century.

The house was listed on the National Register of Historic Places in 1989.

See also
National Register of Historic Places listings in Southbridge, Massachusetts
National Register of Historic Places listings in Worcester County, Massachusetts

References

Houses completed in 1845
Houses in Southbridge, Massachusetts
National Register of Historic Places in Southbridge, Massachusetts
Houses on the National Register of Historic Places in Worcester County, Massachusetts